Bhatikabhaya Abhaya was King of Anuradhapura in the 1st century BC, whose reign lasted from 20 BC to 9 AD. He succeeded his father Kutakanna Tissa as King of Anuradhapura and was succeeded by his brother Mahadathika Mahanaga.

His reign of 29 years is recorded in Sri Lankan history as a very peaceful and prosperous time in the Anuradhapura kingdom.

Relations with Rome

It is mentioned in historical texts that King Bhathikabhaya imported beads from the Roman Empire for offering to the Ruwanwelisaya.

See also
 List of Sri Lankan monarchs
 History of Sri Lanka

References

External links
 Kings & Rulers of Sri Lanka
 Codrington's Short History of Ceylon

B
1st-century Sinhalese monarchs
B
 Sinhalese Buddhist monarchs
B
B